

Brihtwine (or Beorhtwine) was an Anglo-Saxon Bishop of Wells. His consecration date is not known, but he was expelled to restore his predecessor Æthelwine, but was restored and died sometime around 1024.

Citations

References

External links
 

Bishops of Wells
1020s deaths
Year of birth unknown
11th-century English Roman Catholic bishops